The name USS Whipple has been borne by three ships in the United States Navy.  All were named for Commodore Abraham Whipple, a naval commander in the American Revolutionary War.

 , a torpedo boat destroyer commissioned 1903, decommissioned 1919.
 , a destroyer commissioned in 1920 and decommissioned in 1945.
 , a destroyer escort commissioned in 1970, redesignated a frigate in 1975 and decommissioned in 1992.

United States Navy ship names